Metsimotlhabe is a village in Kweneng District of Botswana. The village is located 20 km north-west of Gaborone, along the Gaborone–Molepolole road. The population was 8,884 in 2011 census.

The village is the home of LenMed Health Bokamoso Private Hospital, founded in 2010 and formerly known as  Bokamoso hospital.

References

Kweneng District
Villages in Botswana